Horace Casad Botsford Sr. (November 28, 1877 – March 26, 1948) was an American football coach.

Coaching career

College of Emporia
Botsford was the first head coach at the College of Emporia in Emporia, Kansas.  He held the post for the 1901 season only and posted a record of 4–3.  The school played 11 seasons without an official coach before Botsford was hired.

Kansas State Normal
After one year at College of Emporia, Botsford moved across town to become the third head coach at Kansas State Normal School—now known as Emporia State University.  He held that position for two seasons, from 1902 until 1903.  His coaching record at Kansas State Normal was 7–10–3.

References

1877 births
1948 deaths
College of Emporia Fighting Presbies football coaches
Emporia State Hornets football coaches
People from Yellow Springs, Ohio